Ibanag may refer to:
the Ibanag people; or,
the Ibanag language.